Acrolophus poeyi is a moth of the family Acrolophidae. It is found on St. Vincent.

References

Moths described in 1891
poeyi